The Deposition from the Cross is a painting of the Deposition of Christ by the Italian Renaissance master Fra Angelico, executed between 1432 and 1434. It is now housed in the National Museum of San Marco, Florence.

Giorgio Vasari defined it to have been “painted by a saint or an angel”.

Angelico intervened to complete this altarpiece when it had been already begun by Lorenzo Monaco for the Strozzi Chapel in the Florentine church of Santa Trinita. It portrays Christ supported by several people, with Mary Magdalene kissing his feet, as a symbol of human repentance. A figure on the right, with a red hat, is showing the cross' nails and the horns crown, symbols of passion and sacrifice.

Mary, wearing a dark dress, is shown  in the traditional gesture of keeping hands joined.

External links

San Marco Museum 

1430s paintings
Paintings by Fra Angelico
Angelico
Paintings of the Virgin Mary
Paintings depicting Mary Magdalene
Angels in art
Paintings in the collection of the Museo Nazionale di San Marco
Altarpieces